B.O.S. Better Online Solutions is a publicly traded company, headquartered in Israel, that provides RFID and supply chain solutions. Its shares are traded on the NASDAQ Capital Market.

Company 
B.O.S. Better Online Solutions specializes in RFID solutions as a more efficient alternative to the traditional barcode object identification method. In an interview with The Wall Street Transcript in 2008, president Shmuel Koren commented that the use of RFID is expected to expand rapidly as the cost of RFID tagging declines, regulatory institutions increasingly approve RFID technology, and companies recognize the potential of RFID to increase efficiency.

B.O.S. clients have included Unilever, Otto, IKEA, and Israel's Ministry of Agriculture. In 2011 B.O.S. was awarded Frost & Sullivan's Entrepreneurial Company of the Year award.

Subsidiaries 
 Dimex Systems – automatic data collection solutions provider
 Odem Electronic Technologies – electronic components supplier. Its clients have included Israel Aircraft Industries and Hollandia International.

Products 
 BOS ID – software platform for inventory management
 BOSwine – RFID tagging system for monitoring the health and productivity of sows and piglets
 BOSWaste – RFID waste management system for tracking waste collection and controlling waste-management subcontractors

History 
B.O.S. Better Online Solutions was founded in 1990 by Israel (Izzy) Gal after he left IIS (Intelligent Information Systems, LTD., an Israeli company where Gal worked as a product manager for AS/400 related products.  In its early years B.O.S. specialized in twinax terminal emulation software. In 2009 B.O.S. sold the rights to its e-Twinax Controller, a controller providing TCP/IP compatibility with older twinax devices without the use of SNA, to Phoenix-based 10ZiG Technology. In 2010 B.O.S. closed its two U.S. supply chain subsidiaries (formerly Summit Radio Corp.) due to turbulence in the executive jet market.

In 1996 B.O.S. began trading on what was then the Nasdaq SmallCap Market (today the Nasdaq Capital Market), and in 2000 the company's shares were upgraded to the Nasdaq National Market. Between 2002 and 2009 B.O.S. shares were listed on the Tel Aviv Stock Exchange. In 2009 B.O.S.'s shares were transferred to the Nasdaq Capital Market.

In 2004 Adiv Baruch replaced founder Israel Gal as CEO of the company. In 2006, Baruch was replaced by Shmuel Koren. Koren resigned in 2008 and was succeeded by Shalom Daskal. Daskal left the company in 2009, his place taken by Yuval Viner. Viner has been CEO of the company since 2009.

Acquisitions

See  also 
 Supply chain optimization
 Inventory management software
 Automatic identification and data capture
 List of Israeli companies quoted on the Nasdaq

References 

Software companies established in 1990
Radio-frequency identification companies
Supply chain software companies
Software companies of Israel
Companies listed on the Nasdaq
Business services companies established in 1990
Israeli companies established in 1990